Maruja Callaved Gastón (1928 – 9 January 2018) was a Spanish television presenter and director.

Biography
After settling in Zaragoza, Maruja Callaved studied Philosophy and Literature and graduated in Teaching.

Her professional beginnings were in radio, first at the University of Zaragoza and later at La Voz de Madrid, although she developed almost all of her professional career at Televisión Española, first as a presenter and later as a director.

Subsequently, she was on Panorama de actualidad, with began her association with news services. In the mid-1960s she presented Telediario. In 1963 she received the Antena de Oro for her work in television.

A year later she presented Nivel de Vida, together with Blanca Álvarez.

In 2017, Callaved received a heartfelt tribute in Huesca, at the 1st Product and Gastronomy Congress of the Pyrenees. This was one of her last public appearances, at which she emotionally pointed out, "It is important for me and, from now on, in all the moments of my life. And what's more to do it in Huesca, that is my land and that allows me to speak with heart in hand."

References

External links
 

1928 births
2018 deaths
People from Jaca
Spanish television directors
Spanish television presenters
University of Zaragoza alumni
Women television directors
Spanish women television presenters